The British National Tandem Sprint Championships are held annually, organised by British Cycling.

Barney Storey and Antony Kappes became the first Paralympic team to hold the able-bodied title in 2006.

Results

Senior

References

Past Results
Ian Alsop's results

Cycle racing in the United Kingdom
National track cycling championships
National championships in the United Kingdom
Annual sporting events in the United Kingdom